Samuel James Stout (born April 23, 1984) is a retired Canadian professional mixed martial artist. A professional from 2003 until 2015, Stout is best known for his 20-fight stint with the Ultimate Fighting Championship (UFC), winning Fight of the Night honors seven times. He is also the former TKO Major League MMA Lightweight Champion.

Background
Stout was born in London, Ontario, Canada, on April 23, 1984. Stout has an older sister, Emilie, who would become the wife of late Shawn Tompkins. Albeit Stout followed his father's footsteps and begun karate at a young age, he didn't continue it – or any other sport – very seriously. It wasn't until Tompkins enticed Stout to start kickboxing around 2000. Before transitioning to mixed martial arts, Stout competed in professional kickboxing, holding a record of 16–4 with a win over Kotetsu Boku in K-1 Max.

Mixed martial arts career

Ultimate Fighting Championship
Stout made his UFC debut at UFC 58: USA vs. Canada, on March 4, 2006. Although Stout was originally scheduled to face Kenny Florian, Florian withdraw from the bout due to a back injury. On short notice, Spencer Fisher – of the prestigious Miletich Fighting Systems camp – agreed to substitute for the injured Florian. Stout and Fisher fought for three action packed rounds at with Stout winning a split decision. Although the bout was not aired on the pay-per-view broadcast, the fight has subsequently been shown on episodes of UFC Unleashed. The fight was voted #16 on the UFC's 100 greatest fights show.

Stout succumbed to a rear naked choke submission at the hands of Kenny Florian during The Ultimate Fighter 3 finale on June 24, 2006. Following his loss to Kenny Florian, Stout defeated Jay Estrada by armbar, avenging his first career loss. In February 2007, Stout defeated Brazilian submission grappler Fabio Holanda to defend his TKO World Lightweight Championship.

In Stout's return to the UFC in the main event of UFC Fight Night 10, he was defeated in a rematch by Spencer Fisher via unanimous decision. Later, at UFC 80, he defeated Per Eklund from Sweden, by unanimous decision. Stout lost by split decision to Rich Clementi at UFC 83 in Montreal, Quebec, Canada. The scores were 29–27 Clementi, 29–28 Stout and 29–28 Clementi.

At UFC 89, Stout was defeated by Terry Etim via unanimous decision. Combining precise kicks with fast hands and a precise jab, Etim controlled Stout through the duration of the fight, only having to fend off sporadic and often desperate bursts from the Canadian in reply.

Stout's next fight was against Matt Wiman at UFC 97, which he won via unanimous decision (29–28, 29–28, 29–28) after hurting Wiman with a brutal liver shot. The fight was declared Fight of the Night.

Stout's was set to fight against Phillipe Nover at UFC Fight Night 19. On September 16, 2009, the day of the fight, Nover had a seizure. As a result, the match was cancelled. Stout defeated Joe Lauzon by unanimous decision on January 2, 2010 at UFC 108. The bout earned Fight of the Night honours, giving Stout his fourth FOTN.

Stout was then defeated by Jeremy Stephens via split decision at UFC 113 in his home country of Canada. The bout won the Fight of the Night award, giving Stout his fifth, tying him with Tyson Griffin for the most Fight of the Nights in UFC history.

Stout next faced Paul Taylor on October 23, 2010 at UFC 121. The first round saw Stout bloody Taylor's nose and successfully gain a takedown. Taylor came back in the second, catching Stout on the inside. Stout went on to win a razor thin split decision (29–28, 28–29, 30–27). MMAJunkie scored the fight 29–28 Taylor and Sherdog gave Taylor all 3 rounds.

Stout was expected to face Paul Kelly on February 5, 2011 at UFC 126.  However, Stout was forced out of the bout with an injury and replaced by Donald Cerrone.

Stout next faced Yves Edwards on June 11, 2011 at UFC 131. Stout won the fight via first-round KO after countering Edwards with an overhand left square on the chin and earned Knockout of the Night honours. This also marked Stout's first stoppage victory in the UFC.

Stout was expected to face Dennis Siver on October 29, 2011 at UFC 137.  However, it was announced on August 29, 2011 that Stout had pulled out of the bout.

Stout faced Thiago Tavares on January 14, 2012 at UFC 142. Stout lost the fight by a close unanimous decision (29-28, 29-28, 29-28).

Stout faced Spencer Fisher for a third time on June 22, 2012 at UFC on FX 4. He won the fight by unanimous decision. Both participants earned Fight of the Night honours for their performances.

Stout fought John Makdessi on November 17, 2012 at UFC 154. After being outstruck for three rounds, Stout lost via unanimous decision.

Stout faced Strikeforce import Caros Fodor on February 23, 2013 at UFC 157. Stout defeated Fodor by split decision.

Stout was expected to face Isaac Vallie-Flagg on June 15, 2013 at UFC 161.  However, Vallie-Flagg was forced out with a back injury and was replaced by James Krause. He lost the back-and-forth fight via submission in the third round in a bout that earned both participants Fight of the Night honours.

Stout faced Cody McKenzie on December 14, 2013 at UFC on Fox 9. He won the fight via unanimous decision.

Stout faced K. J. Noons in a welterweight bout on April 16, 2014 at The Ultimate Fighter Nations Finale. He lost the fight via knockout in the first round.

Stout faced Ross Pearson on March 14, 2015 at UFC 185. Stout lost the fight via knockout in the second round after he was dropped with a left hook and finished off with a right hand on the ground.

Stout faced Frankie Perez at UFC Fight Night 74 on August 23, 2015. He lost the fight via knockout in the first round.

Stout announced his retirement from mixed martial arts in September 2015.

Personal life 
Stout has a daughter, Logan (born 2014), from his previous relationship with Tara Cassetta. On April 12, 2020, Stout announced on his social media that he and his wife Jessica Lablanche (Montreal-based makeup artist for Folio Montreal) welcomed a daughter, Sydney, to the world. However, at the age of only a month, she died in her sleep.

Stout has been involved with several other UFC fighters (Sean Pierson, Mark Hominick, and Matt Mitrione) as part of a Toronto area anti-bullying program.

Alongside with Chris Horodecki and Mark Hominick, Stout co-owns the Adrenaline Training Center located in his home town of London, Ontario.

Championships and awards 
 Ultimate Fighting Championship
Fight of the Night (Six times)
Knockout of the Night (One time)
 TKO Major League MMA
TKO Lightweight Championship (One time, with four defences; subsequently vacated title)

Mixed martial arts record 

|-	
|Loss
|align=center|20–12–1
|Frankie Perez
|TKO (punches)
|UFC Fight Night: Holloway vs. Oliveira
|
|align=center|1
|align=center|0:54
|Saskatoon, Saskatchewan, Canada
|
|-
|Loss
|align=center|20–11–1
|Ross Pearson
|KO (punches)
|UFC 185
|
|align=center|2
|align=center|1:33
|Dallas, Texas, United States
|
|-
| Loss
| align=center| 20–10–1
| K. J. Noons
| KO (punches)
| The Ultimate Fighter Nations Finale: Bisping vs. Kennedy
| 
| align=center| 1
| align=center| 0:30
| Quebec City, Quebec, Canada
| 
|-
| Win
| align=center| 20–9–1
| Cody McKenzie
| Decision (unanimous)
| UFC on Fox: Johnson vs. Benavidez 2
| 
| align=center| 3
| align=center| 5:00
| Sacramento, California, United States
| 
|-
| Loss
| align=center| 19–9–1
| James Krause
| Submission (guillotine choke)
| UFC 161
| 
| align=center| 3
| align=center| 4:47
| Winnipeg, Manitoba, Canada
| 
|-
| Win
| align=center| 19–8–1
| Caros Fodor
| Decision (split)
| UFC 157
| 
| align=center| 3
| align=center| 5:00
| Anaheim, California, United States
| 
|-
| Loss
| align=center| 18–8–1
| John Makdessi
| Decision (unanimous)
| UFC 154
| 
| align=center| 3
| align=center| 5:00
| Montreal, Quebec, Canada
| 
|-
| Win
| align=center| 18–7–1
| Spencer Fisher
| Decision (unanimous)
| UFC on FX: Maynard vs. Guida
| 
| align=center| 3
| align=center| 5:00
| Atlantic City, New Jersey, United States
| 
|-
| Loss
| align=center| 17–7–1
| Thiago Tavares
| Decision (unanimous)
| UFC 142
| 
| align=center| 3
| align=center| 5:00
| Rio de Janeiro, Brazil
| 
|-
| Win
| align=center| 17–6–1
| Yves Edwards
| KO (punch)
| UFC 131
| 
| align=center| 1
| align=center| 3:52
| Vancouver, British Columbia, Canada
| 
|-
| Win
| align=center| 16–6–1
| Paul Taylor
| Decision (split)
| UFC 121
| 
| align=center| 3
| align=center| 5:00
| Anaheim, California, United States
| 
|-
| Loss
| align=center| 15–6–1
| Jeremy Stephens
| Decision (split)
| UFC 113
| 
| align=center| 3
| align=center| 5:00
| Montreal, Quebec, Canada
| 
|-
| Win
| align=center| 15–5–1
| Joe Lauzon
| Decision (unanimous)
| UFC 108
| 
| align=center| 3
| align=center| 5:00
| Las Vegas, Nevada, United States
| 
|-
| Win
| align=center| 14–5–1
| Matt Wiman
| Decision (unanimous)
| UFC 97
| 
| align=center| 3
| align=center| 5:00
| Montreal, Quebec, Canada
| 
|-
| Loss
| align=center| 13–5–1
| Terry Etim
| Decision (unanimous) 
| UFC 89
| 
| align=center| 3
| align=center| 5:00
| Birmingham, England
|
|-
| Loss
| align=center| 13–4–1
| Rich Clementi
| Decision (split)
| UFC 83
| 
| align=center| 3
| align=center| 5:00
| Montreal, Quebec, Canada
| 
|-
| Win
| align=center| 13–3–1
| Per Eklund
| Decision (unanimous)
| UFC 80
| 
| align=center| 3
| align=center| 5:00
| Newcastle upon Tyne, England
| 
|-
| Win
| align=center| 12–3–1
| Martin Grandmont
| KO (punches)
| TKO 30: Apocalypse.
| 
| align=center| 1
| align=center| 3:00
| Montreal, Quebec, Canada
| 
|-
| Loss
| align=center| 11–3–1
| Spencer Fisher
| Decision (unanimous)
| UFC Fight Night: Stout vs. Fisher
| 
| align=center| 3
| align=center| 5:00
| Hollywood, Florida, United States
| 
|-
| Win
| align=center| 11–2–1
| Fabio Holanda
| TKO (corner stoppage)
| TKO 28: Inevitable
| 
| align=center| 2
| align=center| 5:00
| Montreal, Quebec, Canada
| 
|-
| Win
| align=center| 10–2–1
| Jay Estrada
| Submission (armbar)
| TKO 27: Reincarnation
| 
| align=center| 2
| align=center| 1:21
| Montreal, Quebec, Canada
| 
|-
| Loss
| align=center| 9–2–1
| Kenny Florian
| Submission (rear-naked choke)
| The Ultimate Fighter: Team Ortiz vs. Team Shamrock Finale
| 
| align=center| 1
| align=center| 1:46
| Las Vegas, Nevada, United States
| 
|-
| Win
| align=center| 9–1–1
| Spencer Fisher
| Decision (split)
| UFC 58
| 
| align=center| 3
| align=center| 5:00
| Las Vegas, Nevada, United States
| 
|-
| Win
| align=center| 8–1–1
| Donald Ouimet
| KO (punches)
| TKO 23: Extreme
| 
| align=center| 1
| align=center| 4:43
| Victoriaville, Quebec, Canada
| 
|-
| Win
| align=center| 7–1–1
| Donald Ouimet
| Decision (split)
| TKO 21: Collision
| 
| align=center| 3
| align=center| 5:00
| Montreal, Quebec, Canada
| 
|-
| Win
| align=center| 6–1–1
| Tyler Jackson
| Decision (unanimous)
| TKO 20: Champion vs. Champion
| 
| align=center| 3
| align=center| 5:00
| Montreal, Quebec, Canada
| 
|-
| Win
| align=center| 5–1–1
| Joey Brown
| TKO (punches)
| TKO 19: Rage
| 
| align=center| 1
| align=center| 2:45
| Montreal, Quebec, Canada
| 
|-
| Win
| align=center| 4–1–1
| Dave Goulet
| KO (head kick)
| TKO 18: Impact
| 
| align=center| 3
| align=center| 0:59
| Montreal, Quebec, Canada
| 
|-
| Win
| align=center| 3–1–1
| Steve Claveau
| TKO (elbows)
| TKO 17: Revenge
| 
| align=center| 1
| align=center| 3:07
| Victoriaville, Quebec, Canada
| 
|-
| Win
| align=center| 2–1–1
| Yves Jabouin
| TKO (punch)
| TKO 16: Infernal
| 
| align=center| 1
| align=center| 4:15
| Quebec City, Quebec, Canada
| 
|-
| Win
| align=center| 1–1–1
| Stephane Laliberte
| TKO (punches)
| TKO: FutureStars
| 
| align=center| 1
| align=center| 4:12
| Victoriaville, Quebec, Canada
| 
|-
| Draw
| align=center| 0–1–1
| Joey Clark
| Draw
| ICC: Trials
| 
| align=center| 2
| align=center| 5:00
| Minnesota, United States
| 
|-
| Loss
| align=center| 0–1
| Jay Estrada
| Submission (rear-naked choke)
| Total Martial Arts Challenge
| 
| align=center| 1
| align=center| 2:14
| Cicero, Illinois, United States
|

See also
 List of current UFC fighters
 List of male mixed martial artists
 List of Canadian UFC fighters

References

External links

 at K-1

1984 births
Living people
Canadian male kickboxers
Canadian male mixed martial artists
Canadian Muay Thai practitioners
Canadian male karateka
Canadian practitioners of Brazilian jiu-jitsu
Lightweight mixed martial artists
Mixed martial artists utilizing Muay Thai
Mixed martial artists utilizing karate
Sportspeople from London, Ontario
Welterweight kickboxers
Ultimate Fighting Championship male fighters